Christy Canyon (born June 17, 1966) is a retired pornographic actress and American radio personality. She is an inductee of the AVN and XRCO Hall of Fame.

Career
Canyon has performed in over 100 adult films. She retired from performing in front of the camera three times, having shot films from September 1984 to March 1985; June 1989 to December 1992; and 1995 to 1997 (as an exclusive/contract performer for Vivid).  She also appeared in photo spreads for Penthouse and Swank magazine.

In her autobiography, Canyon stated that porn actor Greg Rome approached her while she was waiting for a ride in Hollywood, and told her that she would be a terrific figure model. He gave her the business card of adult magazine and film recruiter/agent Jim South, of World Modeling Agency. After visiting South's office, Canyon posed for men's magazines and began her video career shortly thereafter. She has stated that her first on-screen performance was with Ron Jeremy in 1984's "Swedish Erotica 57," and that Jeremy soon became a close friend in the business.

From 2005 to March 2011, she was co-host of Sirius XM Satellite Radio's Playboy Radio show Night Calls. As of April 2011 she became co-host of Sirius XM's Spice Sex Circus with Ginger Lynn and sole host of Sirius XM's weekly Legends of Porn. She co-hosted Radio Sex You Porn on Sirius/XM Channel 102, until October 2013 when the channel went off the air. In December 2013, she became the host of The Christy Canyon Show on Vivid Radio on Sirius/XM Channel 102.

Retirement 
Canyon is retired from performing in adult films and dancing on the road, but she still has an adult-related career, concentrating on her website, working as a host for Vivid Radio, and selling merchandise on eBay and ABIBIDS. In 2003, she published her autobiography, titled Lights, Camera, Sex. In November 2005, she appeared as a judge on the first season of Jenna's American Sex Star.

The ABC News show Nightline featured Canyon in a 2010 interview, in a segment titled Porn: When the Camera Stops as part of the series Modern Sex in America.

Recognition
Canyon has won several "best female performance"-type awards and is a member of both the XRCO and AVN Halls of Fame.

She was namechecked by English electronic band Orchestral Manoeuvres in the Dark on their 1993 track "Heaven Is", in the line: "Heaven is Christy Canyon falling in love with me."

Personal life
	
Canyon has been married and divorced three times and is the mother of two adopted children.

Awards 
1991 F.O.X.E. Female Fan Favorite
1992 F.O.X.E. Female Fan Favorite
1995 XRCO Hall of Fame
1996 AVN Best Tease Performance for Comeback 
1997 AVN Best Group Scene - Film for The Show 
2004 Free Speech Coalition Lifetime Achievement Award 
AVN Hall of Fame

Partial filmography
WPINK (1984)
I Like To Be Watched (1984)
 Wild Things (1985)
Hollywood Starlets (1985)
Educating Mandy (1985)
Black Throat (1985)
Holly Does Hollywood (1985)
 Savage Fury (1985)
Star 90 (1990)
Passages 1-4 (1991)
Comeback (1995)
Oral Addiction (1996)
Domination Nation 1 and 2 (both 1997)
The Top 25 Adult Stars of All Time (1999)

See also
List of pornographic performers by decade

References

External links

 
 
 
 

1966 births
21st-century American women writers
American autobiographers
American pornographic film actresses
American people of Armenian descent
Living people
Actresses from Pasadena, California
Pornographic film actors from California
Radio personalities from California
Women autobiographers